Hålogaland Hospital Trust ( was a health trust owned by Northern Norway Regional Health Authority. It closed down on 1 January 2007. The trust consisted of hospitals in Harstad, Narvik and on Stokmarknes, as well as institutions for treatment of mental disorders and alcohol intoxication. The hospital on Stokmarknes and other institutions became part of Nordland Hospital Trust on 1 September 2006 and is now known as Vesterålen Hospital. The hospitals in Harstad and Narvik with associated institutions became part of University Hospital of North Norway HF (UNN) on 1 January 2007 and is now known as Harstad Hospital and Narvik Hospital.

References
"Barents Rescue 2005 Finnmark-Norway," at https://web.archive.org/web/20141028080438/http://www.finnmarkssykehuset.no/getfile.php/RHF%20INTER/RAPPORTER%20OG%20H%C3%98RINGER/Presentasjon%20helsetjenestens%20deltakelse%20i%20BR%20pr.%20april%202005%20-%20engelsk%20versjon.pdf .
"State Ownership Report," Norwegian Ministry of Trade and Industry, at http://ownershippolicy.net/index.gan?id=16824&subid=0 .

Notes

 

Defunct health trusts of Norway
2002 establishments in Norway
2007 disestablishments in Norway